"Lotto" is a song by South Korean–Chinese boy band Exo, released on August 18, 2016, for the repackaged edition of their third studio album Lotto. It was released in both Korean and Chinese versions by their label SM Entertainment.

Background and release 
Produced by LDN Noise, "Lotto" is described as "hip-hop" song enhanced by the heavy Auto-Tune with the lyrics about a man feeling so lucky, like he won the lottery after meeting the girl he loves. The song was released on August 18 together with the repackage album. Exo began performing the song on South Korean music TV shows on the following day.

Music video 
The Korean and Chinese music videos for "Lotto" were released on August 18, 2016, with choreography by Shit Kingz. The music video is described as "casino themed" and opens with the sound of a slot machine. Apart from Exo performing the song's high-powered choreography, it also shows scenes of the members gambling, watching cockfights, burning piles of money, and other risk-driven activities, before they and a female co-star are taken down by a S.W.A.T. team. The Korean version was the tenth most-watched K-pop music video on YouTube in 2016.

On December 8, 2018, the Korean music video surpassed 100 million views on YouTube.

Promotion 

Exo began performing the song on South Korean music television programs on August 19. Member Kai was absent from promotional activities due to an injury he sustained during the concert tour. "Lotto" was deemed "unfit for broadcast" by KBS, MBC and Mnet, thus was promoted with modified lyrics under the alternative title "Louder" on these TV channels.

Commercial performance 

"Lotto" debuted at number two on the Gaon weekly digital chart and at number one on the Billboard World Digital Songs chart. The song went on to win first place seven times in total on South Korean weekly music television shows.

Charts

Weekly charts

Monthly charts

Sales

Accolades

References 

Exo songs
2016 songs
2016 singles
Korean-language songs
SM Entertainment singles
Hip hop songs